The 30th Filipino Academy of Movie Arts and Sciences Awards Night was held in 1982 in the Philippines.  This is for the Outstanding Achievements of the different  films for the year 1981.

This is the first year in FAMAS history that 3 films won most of the awards. Kumander Alibasbas of JE Productions won the FAMAS Award for Best Picture including the fifth best actor award for Joseph Estrada.   Pakawalan mo Ako won the best actress award for Vilma Santos.  and FPJ Productions' Pagbabalik ng Panday won most of the minor awards. Each of the films won 3 awards.

Awards

Major Awards
Winners are listed first and highlighted with boldface.

Special Awardee

Dr. Ciriaco Santiago Memorial Award 
Lily Monteverde

Dr. Jose Perez Memorial Award
German Moreno

Gregorio Valdez Memorial Award
Marichu Perez-Maceda

 Hall of Fame Award
 Angel Avellana ~ Sound Recording

References

External links
FAMAS Awards 

FAMAS Award
FAMAS
FAMAS